

Karl Burdach (28 July 1891  – 30 December 1976) was a German general in the Wehrmacht during World War II.  He was a recipient of the Knight's Cross of the Iron Cross, of Nazi Germany.

Awards and decorations

 German Cross in Gold on 26 December 1941 as Generalmajor and commander of 251. Infanterie-Division
 Knight's Cross of the Iron Cross on 23 February 1944 as Generalleutnant and commander of 11. Infanterie-Division

References

Citations

Bibliography

 
 

1891 births
1976 deaths
Military personnel from Chemnitz
Lieutenant generals of the German Army (Wehrmacht)
German Army personnel of World War I
People from the Kingdom of Saxony
Recipients of the clasp to the Iron Cross, 1st class
Recipients of the Gold German Cross
Recipients of the Knight's Cross of the Iron Cross
German prisoners of war in World War II held by the United States
Reichswehr personnel